Ekrem Ekşioğlu (born January 16, 1978 in Ankara) is a Turkish retired football defender.

External links
 
 Guardian Stats Centre

1978 births
Living people
Akçaabat Sebatspor footballers
Karşıyaka S.K. footballers
İstanbul Başakşehir F.K. players
Kayseri Erciyesspor footballers
Süper Lig players
Turkish footballers
Footballers from Ankara
Association football defenders